Justine Ludwig is a director, curator, and writer. She is the Executive Director of Creative Time. Her research interests include the intersections of aesthetics and architecture, violence, economics, and globalization.

Education 
Ludwig has an MA in Global Arts from Goldsmiths University of London and a BA in Art with a concentration in Art History from Colby College.

Career 
Ludwig currently is the Executive Director at Creative Time. She was responsible for catalyzing the organization's Emerging Artist Open Call program, which invites emerging artists from New York City to work with Creative Time to realize their first exhibition in the public realm. Its first iteration was the critically acclaimed The Privilege of Escape by Risa Puno. At the organization, she has focused on socially engaged artwork, such as Jenny Holzer's 2019 VIGIL, which projected gun violence testimonies onto the buildings of Rockefeller Center.

Ludwig was the Chief Curator and Deputy Director of Dallas Contemporary from 2015 to 2018. In Dallas, she brought an international perspective to her curatorial approach, exhibiting artists such as Bani Abidi and Nadia Kaabi-Linke. Her exhibitions, featuring artists such as Pia Camil and Paola Pivi, earned her critical acclaim in W Magazine. In Dallas, she also placed an emphasis on increasing support for local artists. Ludwig was instrumentall in establishing Dallas as an emergent art capital, describing Dallas as “a city in a state of becoming." She curated Future Worlds, the 2018 iteration of Aurora, an expansive public art event that transformed downtown Dallas into an open-air hub for installation, light, and sound art. The exhibition featured artists dealing with climate change, automation, and political unrest.

Previously, Ludwig was assistant and adjunct curator at Contemporary Arts Center in Cincinnati. She has also held posts at the Museum of Fine Arts Boston, the Rose Art Museum at Brandeis University, the Colby College Museum of Art, and the MIT List Visual Arts Center.

Ludwig has curated projects with Shilpa Gupta, Kiki Smith, Pedro Reyes, Laercio Rendondo, Paola Pivi, Ambreen Butt, and Anila Quayyum Agha.

Her writing has been published in Whitehot Magazine, Patron Magazine, and affidavit.

Awards and recognition 
In 2016, Artsy named Ludwig one of 'The 20 Most Influential Young Curators in the United States'. In 2019, Town & Country included Ludwig in its list of '102 people who will be invited everywhere this season'.

References 

Year of birth missing (living people)
Living people
Alumni of Goldsmiths, University of London
Colby College alumni
British curators
British women curators